Under the Mountain is a 1979 children's book by New Zealand writer Maurice Gee.  It has been adapted into a 1981 television miniseries, a 2009 film and stage show.

Plot

Beneath the extinct volcanoes surrounding the city, giant creatures are waking from a spellbound sleep that has lasted thousands of years.  Their goal is the destruction of the world.

Rachel and Theo Matheson are twins.  Apart from having red hair, there is nothing remarkable about them – or so they think. They are horrified to discover that they have a strange and awesome destiny.  Only the Matheson twins can save the world from the terror of what is under the mountain.

References

External links 

 Teachers notes

1979 novels
Books by Maurice Gee
New Zealand children's books
Children's fantasy novels
New Zealand fantasy novels
1979 children's books
20th-century New Zealand novels